Jenő Ambrózi (born 1 August 1949) is a Hungarian weightlifter. He competed in the men's lightweight event at the 1972 Summer Olympics.

References

External links
 

1949 births
Living people
Hungarian male weightlifters
Olympic weightlifters of Hungary
Weightlifters at the 1972 Summer Olympics
Sportspeople from Budapest
20th-century Hungarian people